The Cook Islands Handball Association (CIHA) is the governing body for the sport of handball and beach handball in the Cook Islands. CIHA is member of the Oceania Continent Handball Federation (OCHF), International Handball Federation (IHF) and the Commonwealth Handball Association (CHA).

National teams
 Cook Islands men's national handball team
 Cook Islands men's national junior handball team
 Cook Islands men's national youth handball team

See also
 Oceania Handball Nations Cup
 Oceania Handball Challenge Trophy

References

 Oceania Continent Handball Federation

External links
 Official webpage
 Profile on International Handball Federation webpage

National members of the Oceania Continent Handball Federation
Sports organizations established in 1999
Handball governing bodies
National members of the International Handball Federation
1999 establishments in the Cook Islands